The Undeclared War is a British near-future thriller television mini-series, aired from 30 June 2022 on Channel 4. The series is written by Peter Kosminsky.

Plot

The series follows two main characters, Saara Parvin in the UK and Vadim Trusov in Russia, during a cyber and misinformation attack upon the UK.

Parvin has just started a one-year student-placement at GCHQ when a cyber-attack takes down some of the UK-internet and she joins the team examining the code of the malware. She is praised when she discovers a second attack within the code and a diligent search  for a third attack doesn't find one.

Meanwhile, she feels alienated within GCHQ but makes friends with John Yeabsley who spends his lunch-time correcting the grammar of other people's blogs. He, in turn, says how alienating it is to not be able to talk about his work outside. We later find that Parvin hasn't told her family where she is working and her brother is appalled when she finally tells him.

Trusov had attended a class with Parvin in London and when he returns to Russia he starts working for Russia's twitter-misinformation campaign but when the UK crash the facility as reprisal for the malware he reluctantly joins the offensive malware department.

Russia escalates the attack and incites unrest in the UK by interfering with the reporting of a general election whereupon the UK remotely destroys some Russian arms dumps. Russia exaggerate the damage and uses it as a pretext for isolating GCHQ from NSA by leaking NSA software from a UK site.

Trusov eventually reveals that this was all planned by Russia and he deliberately and openly leaks all the Russian software to GCHQ as a gift that the UK can use to appeal for help from the USA just as the tit-for-tat reprisals become overtly physical. In the last scene, Parvin stands stricken with grief because Trusov has sacrificed himself.

Cast
 Hannah Khalique-Brown as Saara Parvin
 Simon Pegg as Danny Patrick
 Maisie Richardson-Sellers as Kathy Freeman
 Edward Holcroft as James Cox
 Adrian Lester as Andrew Makinde
 Alex Jennings as David Neal
 Mark Rylance as John Yeabsley
 Alfie Friedman as Gabriel Davies
 Kerry Godliman as Angie McMurray
 German Segal as Vadim Trusov
 Joss Porter as Phil
 Tinatin Dalakishvili as Marina Veselova

Episodes

Reception

Critical response
On the review aggregator website Rotten Tomatoes, 69% of 26 critics' reviews are positive, with an average rating of 5.4/10.

Controversy 
The show's adverts were inspired by the panic-provoking 1938 radio adaption of The War of the Worlds, and subject to complaints to the UK broadcasting regulator Ofcom due to the adverts being broadcast as if they were live news broadcasts.

Technical accuracy 
The global cyber-security firm NCC Group were consultants to the show. They developed the on-screen code whilst advising on and producing the mock-ups for the wider technical visuals.

References

External links
 
 

2022 British television series debuts
2022 British television series endings
2020s British drama television series
2020s British television miniseries
English-language television shows
Intelligence agencies in fiction
GCHQ
Serial drama television series
Channel 4 television dramas
Television series set in 2024
Television series by Universal Television
Peacock (streaming service) original programming